Dehydroretinal (3,4-dehydroretinal) is a derivative metabolite of retinal belonging to the group of vitamin A2 as a retinaldehyde form, besides the endogenously present 3,4-dehydroretinol and 3,4-dehydroretinoic acid.

The livers of some freshwater fishes and some fish found in India contain a higher ratio of dehydroretinal to retinal than do other species.

See also
 Retinene

References

Vision
Signal transduction
Apocarotenoids
Photosynthetic pigments
Vitamins